Palais de Reine (パレドゥレーヌ) is a PC  videogame that was released on November 10, 2006 and was later released on PlayStation 2 on October 18, 2007 from Interchannel. It was published in English through the Steam platform for PCs on June 18, 2020 by Degica. It could be considered both a strategy game and an otome game. The player acts as the young princess of a kingdom who never expected to ascend to the throne. In the last year, her father died, and her older brother went missing. During the coronation ceremony, some of the leaders of the 12 provinces in the kingdom say they don't believe she can lead the country, and refuse to give their allegiance.

The aim of the game is to win over enough leaders over a year to be accepted as the kingdom's ruler. This can be accomplished through different ways, including sending gifts, having your knights challenge the leaders to jousting competitions, and trying to assassinate them. You must also keep your kingdom fairly prosperous and quell civil disturbances and unrest.

While doing this, you can also 'romance' characters, including the 12 leaders and your knights.

External links 
 Official Site
 Steam Store Page

Otome games